Chase Field, formerly Bank One Ballpark, is a retractable roof stadium in Downtown Phoenix, Arizona. It is the home of Major League Baseball's Arizona Diamondbacks. It opened in 1998, the year the Diamondbacks debuted as an expansion team. Chase Field was the first stadium built in the United States with a retractable roof over a natural-grass playing surface.

History
The park was built during a wave of new, baseball-only parks in the 1990s. Although nearly all of these parks were open-air, it was taken for granted that a domed stadium was a must for a major-league team to be a viable venture in the Phoenix area.

Stadium funding controversy
In the spring of 1994, the Maricopa County Board of Supervisors approved a quarter percentage point increase in the county sales tax to pay for their portion of the stadium funding. This came about at a time that the county itself was facing huge budget deficits and lack of funding for other services. The sales tax being levied was very unpopular with local citizens, who were not allowed to vote on the issue of funding a baseball stadium with general sales tax revenue (usage of public subsidies for stadium projects was actually prohibited by a 1989 referendum). The issue was so controversial and divisive that in August 1997, Maricopa County Supervisor Mary Rose Wilcox was shot and injured while leaving a county board meeting by Larry Naman, a homeless man, who attempted to argue in court that her support for the tax justified his attack. In May 1998, Naman was found guilty of attempted first-degree murder.

Costs for the stadium were originally estimated at $279 million in 1995, but cost overruns (in part because of rising prices for steel and other materials) pushed the final price to $364 million. As part of the original stadium deal, the Diamondbacks were responsible for all construction costs above $253 million. These extra expenses, combined with the Diamondbacks and their fellow expansion franchise, the Tampa Bay Devil Rays, not being allowed to share in the national MLB revenue for their first 5 years of operations, left the Diamondbacks in a less-than-desirable financial situation, which would come back to haunt team founder and managing partner Jerry Colangelo and his group later on.

Since 1996
Construction on the park began in 1996, and was finished just before the Diamondbacks' first season began, in 1998. It was the third MLB stadium to have a retractable roof and the first in the United States (at the time, only Toronto's SkyDome (now known as Rogers Centre) and Montreal's Olympic Stadium had them; others are now at Minute Maid Park in Houston, American Family Field in Milwaukee, Globe Life Field in Arlington, T-Mobile Park in Seattle, and LoanDepot Park in Miami). It was also the first ballpark to feature natural grass in a retractable roof stadium.

The stadium hosted Games 1, 2, 6, and 7 of the 2001 World Series between the Arizona Diamondbacks and the New York Yankees. The Diamondbacks won all four home games, winning the title in seven games, and thus denying the Yankees a fourth consecutive championship. It was the first time since  that the home team won all games of a World Series.

In March 2006, Chase Field played host to three first-round games of the World Baseball Classic.

Chase Field hosted the Major League Baseball All-Star Game in 2011.

Chase Field hosted the 2017 National League Wild Card Game between the Diamondbacks and Colorado Rockies. This was the D-Backs' first appearance in the postseason as a Wild Card team. The D-Backs won 11–8 and advanced to the 2017 NLDS against the Los Angeles Dodgers but were swept in three games. Game 3 was held at Chase Field, when the D-Backs lost 3–1.

Chase Field also has a swimming pool located in right-center field, which is rented to patrons as a suite holding 35 guests for $3,500 per game during the 2011 season. Mark Grace was the first player to hit a home run into the pool.

Besides baseball, the pool has been used by Monster Jam's Jim Koehler to continue his tradition of swimming after Freestyle. The ballpark also featured a dirt strip between home plate and the pitcher's mound. This dirt strip, sometimes known as the "keyhole", was very common in old-time ballparks up to 1938. The dirt strip was removed when synthetic turf was installed in 2019; today, Comerica Park is the only park to still have this.

The park's foul territory is somewhat larger than is the case for most ballparks built in the 1990s. With 80% of the seats in foul territory, the upper deck is one of the highest in the majors. The park's suites are tucked far under the third deck, which keeps the upper deck closer to the action, with the exception of their Dugout Suites which sit next to the home and visitor's dugouts.

Before the 2008 season began, a brand new HD scoreboard was installed beyond center field, replacing the original. It is the fifth largest HD screen in Major League Baseball behind Kauffman Stadium. The screen at Kauffman is larger by overall area and is square in shape but Chase Field's screen is larger by length and is rectangular.

Premium seating includes 4,400 club seats, 57 suites, 6 party suites, Executive suite, batters box suite, two dugout suites, and a swimming pool.

The Diamondbacks and St. Louis Cardinals game on September 24, 2019 became the longest game in Chase Field's history. The game lasted six hours and 53 minutes in 19 innings.

On October 12, 2018, the Diamondbacks announced that they would be replacing their natural grass surface with a synthetic surface from Shaw Sports Turf for the 2019 season. In 2019, leaked images of a potential new stadium by architectural firm MEIS Architects had a brief life online before being removed shortly thereafter by the firm.

Naming rights
The stadium was originally called Bank One Ballpark when Bank One of Chicago, Illinois, purchased naming rights for $100 million over 30 years. After Bank One merged with New York-based JPMorgan Chase & Co. in 2005, Chase assumed the commitment to the naming deal and the stadium's name was changed to Chase Field.

Notable events

The stadium also hosts occasional concerts and international soccer games. For football and soccer, the field is set up with the end lines perpendicular to the third-base line and temporary bleachers added on the east side.

International baseball tournaments

Chase Field has hosted first-round games in the 2006 and 2013 World Baseball Classic tournaments, and is scheduled to host first-round games in the 2023 tournament which was postponed from 2021 due to the COVID-19 pandemic.

College sports

The organizers of the Insight.com Bowl elected to move their game from Arizona Stadium in Tucson to Phoenix beginning in 2000, and Chase Field became the game's host. In 2006, the bowl game moved to Sun Devil Stadium, to replace the Fiesta Bowl, which moved to State Farm Stadium in Glendale. The football configuration was notable because of the lack of nets behind the goalposts and the dugout behind the south end zone. The final Insight Bowl played at Chase was between the hometown Arizona State Sun Devils and the Rutgers Scarlet Knights.  The bowl, now known as the  Guaranteed Rate Bowl, returned to Chase Field in January 2016 due to construction being done at Sun Devil Stadium.

Chase Field has staged nine women's college basketball games. The second game, which was played on December 18, 2006, was shortened by rain with four minutes and 18 seconds remaining and Arizona State leading Texas Tech 61–45. Venue staff closed the roof in an effort to finish the game, but officials deemed the court unsafe. In 2000, ASU played the Tennessee Volunteers at the same facility.

In 2006, Chase Field was the site of the annual "Challenge at Chase", a college baseball game between Arizona State and University of Arizona, but the event occurred for only two years. The Arizona Wildcats won both contests in 2006 and 2007.  There were no more “Challenge” games scheduled afterwards.

Concerts

Other events
In February 2006, the Professional Bull Riders hosted a Built Ford Tough Series bull riding event at this venue. Chris Shivers won this event with a total score of 181.5 points (out of a possible 200) on two bulls, including an impressive 93.75 (out of 100) points on Taylor Made bucking bull, Smokeless Wardance, in the short-go round. During the long-go round, the roof was closed, but during the short-go, the roof was opened.

The stadium has hosted Monster Energy  Supercross rounds from 1999 to 2015. Monster Jam came to Chase Field every year in late January about two weeks after Monster Energy Supercross. Both events moved to the University of Phoenix Stadium in 2016.

WWE hosted the Royal Rumble at Chase Field on January 27, 2019, marking nearly 16 years that a WWE event was held at a  baseball stadium since WrestleMania XIX at Safeco Field in Seattle and the first Royal Rumble to be held outdoors.

International women's soccer matches

Roof and cooling system

Chase Field's roof is opened or closed depending on the game-time temperature.  Even when the roof is closed, the park's windows allow enough sunlight to play in true daylight without overheating the stadium. The roof takes about 4½ minutes to open or close at a cost of $2–$3.

While the ballpark had a grass surface, the roof would be kept open to expose the playing surface to sunlight. When necessary, it would be closed three hours before game time using two 200-horsepower motors triggered from a control room in the upper deck above left-center field. A massive HVAC system then dropped the temperature inside the park to about 78 °F (25.5 °C) by the time the gates open. The cooling plant, located in a separate building right outside the ballpark, freezes water overnight to reduce daytime electricity demand. Originally, the HVAC system didn't cool above row 25 of the upper level, exposing fans in the higher rows to the brunt of Phoenix' oppressive summer heat. Subsequent improvements kept virtually all of the facility in air-conditioned comfort.
 Following the introduction of a synthetic playing surface, the roof has been kept closed at most times and is now opened only on game days when weather permits, greatly reducing the facility's demand on the HVAC system.

Transportation
Chase Field is served by Westbound METRO Rail's Washington at 3rd Street station and Eastbound METRO Rail's Jefferson at 3rd Street station.

Climate

References

External links

 Stadium site on MLB.com
 Official Site
 Stadium picture
 Chase Field Page at S&E News
 Chase Field Seating Chart

Arizona Diamondbacks stadiums
Baseball venues in Arizona
Sports venues completed in 1998
JPMorgan Chase buildings
Major League Baseball venues
Defunct NCAA bowl game venues
Retractable-roof stadiums in the United States
Soccer venues in Arizona
Sports venues in Phoenix, Arizona
World Baseball Classic venues
Basketball venues in Arizona
1998 establishments in Arizona